The Simple Past or Le passé simple is a 1977 French drama film directed by Michel Drach.

Plot 
Cécile has just had a terrible car accident. Her husband François got to the hospital while she is still in a coma. When she wakes up, she does not recognize Francois and forgot all the circumstances of the accident.

Cast 

 Marie-José Nat as Cécile
 Victor Lanoux as François
 Anne Lonnberg as Josepha
 Vania Vilers as Bruno
 Roland Blanche as The Renter
 Marc Eyraud as Doctor Mercier

Accolades

References

External links 

1977 drama films
1977 films
French drama films
1970s French films